Markus Nomil Iversen (born 1834, date of death unknown) was a Norwegian ship-owner and politician.

He was elected to the Parliament of Norway in 1877, representing the constituency of Sarpsborg. He worked as a timber merchant and ship-owner there. He served only one term.

References

1834 births
Year of death missing
Norwegian businesspeople in shipping
Members of the Storting
Østfold politicians
People from Sarpsborg